Nancy Namrouqa (born 1 June 1974 in Amman) is the Jordanian Minister of State for Legal Affairs. She was appointed on 27 October 2022.

Education 
Namrouqa holds a Doctor of Philosophy in Public Law (2016) from the Amman Arab University.

References 

21st-century Jordanian politicians
1974 births
Amman Arab University alumni
Government ministers of Jordan
Jordanian politicians
Living people
State ministers of Jordan